Yale-China Chinese Language Centre (CLC), formerly the New Asia - Yale-in-China Chinese Language Centre, is a Cantonese and Mandarin language study centre at the Chinese University of Hong Kong.

The school offers various programmes geared toward different types of students, including Cantonese and Mandarin programmes for foreigners, Mandarin classes for Hong Kongers, and Cantonese classes for Mainland Chinese students and migrants to Hong Kong.

The school is headquartered at the CUHK campus in Shatin, and had additional classrooms in Jordan, Kowloon from July 2017 until May 2020.

History
The CLC was established by Jennie Mak Ling in 1961 to teach Cantonese to foreigners. Ling studied at Diocesan Girls' School and Yale Divinity School. After returning to Hong Kong, she began teaching Chinese in her family home.

In 1963 the school received support from New Asia College and the Yale-China Association and was renamed New Asia–Yale-in-China Chinese Language Centre. It moved to New Asia in the spring of 1963. The centre was formally incorporated into the Chinese University of Hong Kong in 1974. The centre's partnership with the Yale-China Association (then called Yale-in-China) was a result of the Communist insurgency in China and the subsequent deterioration in relations between the People's Republic of China and the United States, which led to "Yale-in-China" being expelled from China, with their properties there seized by the new Chinese government. Yale-in-China therefore started a partnership with New Asia College in Hong Kong.

A new headquarters for the school, located at the CUHK campus across the street from University station, was built at a cost of $1.5 million with the support of the Fong Shu Fook Tong Foundation. The so-named Fong Shu Chuen Building was opened on 24 January 1980 by Chief Secretary Jack Cater. This building remains the headquarters of the school.

In 1998, the centre launched a Cantonese-language programme for Mainland Chinese students.

Notable alumni 
 Lindzay Chan, dancer
 Gregory Charles Rivers, actor
 Sujan R. Chinoy, Indian diplomat
 Arthur Li, member of the Executive Council
 Christine Loh, undersecretary for the environment
 Kevin Rudd, former prime minister of Australia

References

External links
 

1961 establishments in Hong Kong
Academic language institutions
Chinese University of Hong Kong
Schools of Chinese as a second or foreign language